Albert Charles "Doc" Waldbauer (February 22, 1892 – July 16, 1969) was a Major League Baseball pitcher who played for one season. He played for the Washington Senators for two games during the 1917 Washington Senators season.

External links

1892 births
1969 deaths
Major League Baseball pitchers
Washington Senators (1901–1960) players
Baseball players from Richmond, Virginia
Newport News Shipbuilders players
Richmond Virginians (minor league) players
Wichita Jobbers players
Atlanta Crackers players
Jersey City Skeeters players
Sioux City Indians players
Galveston Pirates players
Sioux City Packers players